Chandipriya is a 1980 Telugu language film directed by V. Madhusudhana Rao starring Jaya Prada and Sobhan Babu. The film was based on the novel of the same name written by Polkampalli Santha Devi.

Plot
Rich and arrogant Chandipriya rejects poor man Anil's love. Indranil, Anil's rich step-brother, intervenes and challenges Chandipriya that someday she would have to accept Anil's love for her.

Cast

 Sobhan Babu ... Indranil
 Jaya Prada ... Chandipriya
 Anjali Devi ... Saradamma
 Chiranjeevi ... Anil Kumar
 Suvarna ... Asha
 Gummadi ... Prasada Rao
 Allu Ramalingaiah ... Anand Rao
 P. L. Narayana ... .Gaali Subba Rao
 Potti Prasad... Avtharam
 S.V. Jagga Rao
 Girija ... Singamma
 K.V. Lakshmi 
 Madhumathi
 Vijayakala
 Swarna
 Kanta Rao ... Guest Role
 Manju Bhargavi ... Guest Role
C.H. Narayana Rao .... Seth (Guest Role)

Soundtrack

References

External links

1980 films
Films directed by V. Madhusudhana Rao
Films based on novels by Yaddanapudi Sulochana Rani
1980s Telugu-language films
Films scored by P. Adinarayana Rao